Thyaira was a town of ancient Lydia, inhabited during Roman times.
 
Its site is located near Tire, Asiatic Turkey.

References

Populated places in ancient Lydia
Former populated places in Turkey
Tire District
History of İzmir Province